Garlavoddu is a village of Enkoor village gram panchyath and famous temple village in Khammam district, Telangana.

External links
Garlavoddu on WikiMapia
Sri Lakshmi Narasimhaswami temple Garlaoddu on WikiMapia

Villages in Khammam district